Lhatu is a Bhutanese politician who has been a member of the National Council of Bhutan, since May 2018.

References 

Members of the National Council (Bhutan)
1960s births
Living people